Miss Chinese International Pageant (formerly 國際華裔小姐競選), or MCI for short, is an annual international beauty pageant, organized and broadcast by TVB, a network television station in Hong Kong. It was established in 1988 and the Chinese name of the pageant was rebranded in 2007.

The current Miss Chinese International is Miss Hong Kong 2018 winner Hera Chan, who was crowned at the Miss Chinese International Pageant 2019. 

The 31st Miss Chinese International Pageant of 2020, originally scheduled to take place February 2020, was postponed to 2021 due to the ongoing COVID-19 pandemic.

Composition

At its inception in 1988, in what was formerly British Hong Kong, delegates were either winners or runners-up of regional Chinese beauty pageants around the world excluding the country of China, as originally, this was a pageant for Chinese delegates from overseas. In 2007, pageant organizers altered the entry requirements to include delegates representing Mainland China.  All delegates at the time of the pageant are between the ages at least of 17 and 25, with the upper age limit expanded to 27 in 2012. The delegates must be of at least partial Chinese descent.

In 2009, a record number of 11 delegates came from Mainland China, more than one-third of the total contestant count. The number of China delegates has since decreased, with the 2013 pageant having only one Mainland Chinese delegate, representing Foshan.

Chinese name change 
Starting in 2007, the pageant allowed mainland Chinese participants, and the Chinese name of the pageant changed from 國際華裔小姐競選 (Cantonese: Gwokjai Wayeui Siuje Gingsyun; Mandarin: Guójì huáyì xiǎojiě jìngxuǎn), which literally translated to "Miss International of Chinese Descent Pageant" to  國際中華小姐競選  (Cantonese: Gwokjai Jungwa Siuje Gingsyun (Mandarin: Guójì zhōnghuá xiǎojiě jìngxuǎn) to reflect the change, matching the English pageant title of Miss Chinese International Pageant.

Participating regions

Africa
Johannesburg, South Africa (1989; 1992–1997; 2003; 2006–2007; 2016–2017)

The Americas
North America
Calgary, Alberta, Canada (1988–1996, 1998–2005, 2007–2008)
Chicago, United States (1989–2007, 2009–2015, 2019)
Edmonton, Alberta, Canada (1988–1993)
Honolulu, United States (1995; 1997; 1999; 2001–2002; 2018–present)
Los Angeles, United States (1993–2005; 2013–present)
Montreal, Quebec, Canada (1988–present)
New York City, United States (1993–present)
San Francisco, United States (1988–2010; 2014–2015; 2017-present)
Scarborough, Ontario, Canada (1988, 1991)
Seattle, United States (1988–2010; 2013–2015)
Toronto, Ontario, Canada (1988–present)
Vancouver, British Columbia, Canada (1988–present)
Victoria, British Columbia, Canada (1989–1994)

South America
Lima, Peru (2003–2006)

Europe
Amsterdam, Netherlands (2002–2010)
Frankfurt, Germany (2005)
The Hague, Netherlands (2002)
London, England (1988-1991; 1996–2000; 2012; 2019)
Paris, France (2008)
Rotterdam, Netherlands (2007)
Tübingen, Germany (2009)

Asia
Bangkok, Thailand (1991–1998; 2000–2008; 2010–2017; 2019)
Beijing, China (2009-2012)
Brunei (1993)
Chongqing, China (2008–2009)
Dalian, Liaoning, China (2012)
Foshan, Guangdong, China (2007–2010; 2013–2015; 2017-present)
Guangdong, China (2007–2012)
Guangxi, China (2007)
Hangzhou, China (2008-2009)
Harbin, China (2009)
Heilongjiang, China (2009)
Hong Kong (1988–present)
Jiangsu, China (2015)
Ipoh, Malaysia (1993)
Jilin, China (2009)
Johor State, Malaysia (1991)
Kuala Lumpur, Malaysia (1995–present)
Laos (2018–present)
Macau (1988–1998; 2009–2010)
Manila, Philippines (1988–1994; 2000–2013; 2017–2018)
Nanjing, Jiangsu, China (2009; 2016)
Nanning, China (2007)
Penang, Malaysia (1989–1992)
Quezon City, Philippines (1994)
Singapore (1988–present)
Taipei, Chinese Taipei (1988–2006)
Wuhan, Hubei, China (2009)
Zhengzhou, Henan, China (2009-2012)

Oceania
Auckland, New Zealand (1991-2017)
Brisbane, Australia (1988–2005; 2019)
Christchurch, New Zealand (1993)
Hastings, New Zealand (1989-1991)
Melbourne, Australia (1988–present)
Sydney, Australia (1988–present)
Tahiti, French Polynesia (1988–2010; 2018–present)

Pageant timeframe
The first two pageants (1988 & 1989) were held in the fourth quarter of the calendar year.  However, in 1990, TVB decided to shift the pageant date to the beginning of the year to coincide with Lunar New Year. But since Miss Chinese International Pageant 1989 was not held until mid-December, the 3rd Miss Chinese International Pageant came early 1991 with no pageant being held in 1990. Since then, the pageant was held late January or early February of every year.

In 2010, the pageant reverted to being held in November, delaying the 22nd Miss Chinese International Pageant by almost 10 months. Therefore, Christine Kuo, Miss Chinese International 2009 is the longest serving titleholder, having served 658 days from January 17, 2009 to November 5, 2010. The delay of the pageant meant that several regional titleholders from 2009 were not able to enter Miss Chinese International Pageant 2010 as they have already crowned their successors by November 2010, including Miss Hong Kong 2009 Sandy Lau. Miss Hong Kong Pageant 2010 was held in August and Lau's successor, Toby Chan, represented Hong Kong in Miss Chinese International 2010 instead.

One year later, TVB announced that the 23rd Miss Chinese International Pageant would be delayed until January 15, 2012, meaning that there would be no pageant held in 2011.  This is the first time since 1990 a pageant would not be held during a calendar year.  As with the year before, several regional titleholders from 2010 would not be able to enter Miss Chinese International Pageant 2012 as they have already crowned their successors by the end of 2011.  However, the organizers allowed 2010 regional titleholders from Auckland, Kuala Lumpur, Melbourne, Montreal, Toronto, and Vancouver to compete with their 2011 counterparts in Miss Chinese International 2012, marking a first in the pageant's history where two representatives of the same region compete together.

The 31st Miss Chinese International Pageant was originally scheduled to take place on February 15, 2020 in Hong Kong.  However, on January 28, 2020, organizer TVB announced that due to the ongoing COVID-19 pandemic, for the safety of the delegates, crew, and audience, the pageant would be postponed to the year 2021, with the actual date to be announced.

Results
Delegates representing Canadian cities have won 11 iterations of the competition; with Vancouver winning seven titles (2001, 2002, 2004, 2005, 2010, 2013, 2016), Toronto three times (1992, 1997 and 2009) and Montreal once (1993).

Delegates from pageant organizer Hong Kong have won four times (1988, 2000, 2014, 2019), and have recorded the most top three finishes with 19.

Delegates representing New York City, USA have won thrice, first in 1999, followed by back-to-back wins in 2017 and 2018.

Major award winners

Notes
a ^ In 1999, Amy Chung was stripped of her title of Miss Chinese International 1996 Second Runner-Up and had her artiste contract with TVB terminated when it was discovered that she had an outstanding warrant for her arrest in USA as she left the country to enter the pageant while on probation stemming from a credit card fraud conviction.  Chung had also lied about her academic credentials, claiming to have a Masters Degree from Harvard University when she only has taken a course from Harvard Extension School. The title has yet to be filled since.

Gallery of Winners

References

External links

Miss Chinese International Pageant 2017 Official Page

TVB original programming
 
1988 establishments in Hong Kong
1988 establishments in the United Kingdom
1988 establishments in China
International beauty pageants
Continental beauty pageants